Robin Gray may refer to:

 Robin Gray (Australian politician) (born 1940), former Australian politician, Premier of Tasmania, 1982–1989
 Robin Gray (curler), Irish male curler
 Robin Gray (New Zealand politician) (1931–2022), New Zealand politician
 Auld Robin Gray, a 1772 Scots ballad written by Lady Anne Lindsay

See also
Robin Grey (disambiguation)

Gray, Robin